Jorge Luis Alonso (born April 1966) is a United States district judge of the United States District Court for the Northern District of Illinois and former Illinois state judge.

Biography

Alonso was born in 1966 in Sagua La Grande, Las Villas, Cuba. He went to Loyola High School in Miami, Fl. He received a Bachelor of Arts degree in 1988 from the University of Miami. He received a Juris Doctor in 1991 from the George Washington University Law School. He served as an Assistant Public Defender in the Office of the Cook County Public Defender from 1991 to 2003, where he represented indigent individuals in both civil and criminal proceedings. From 2003 to 2014, he  served as an Associate Judge of the Circuit Court of Cook County, a state trial court of general jurisdiction.

Federal judicial service

On August 5, 2014, President Barack Obama nominated Alonso to serve as a United States District Judge of the United States District Court for the Northern District of Illinois, to the seat vacated by Judge Ronald A. Guzman who took senior status on November 16, 2014. He received a hearing before the United States Senate Committee on the Judiciary for September 9, 2014. On November 20, 2014 his nomination was reported out of committee by voice vote. On Saturday, December 13, 2014 Senate Majority Leader Harry Reid filed a motion to invoke cloture on the nomination. On December 16, 2014, Reid withdrew his cloture motion on Alonso's nomination, and the Senate proceeded to vote to confirm Alonso in a voice vote. He received his federal judicial commission on December 19, 2014.

See also
List of Hispanic/Latino American jurists

References

External links

1966 births
Living people
People from Sagua la Grande
American judges of Cuban descent
Hispanic and Latino American judges
Illinois lawyers
Judges of the Circuit Court of Cook County
Judges of the United States District Court for the Northern District of Illinois
Public defenders
United States district court judges appointed by Barack Obama
21st-century American judges
University of Miami alumni
George Washington University Law School alumni